Maria Stamate (born 22 June 1999) is a Romanian footballer who plays as a midfielder for Olimpia Cluj and the Romania women's national team.

Career
She made her debut for the Romania national team on 27 October 2020 against Switzerland, coming on as a substitute for Andreea Corduneanu.

References

1999 births
Living people
Women's association football midfielders
Romanian women's footballers
Romania women's international footballers
FCU Olimpia Cluj players